Maldives had a national team compete in the fifth Asian Netball Championship held in Colombo in 2001.

References

Bibliography

External links 
Olympic Council of Asia